The 1988 Hawaii Rainbow Warriors football team represented the University of Hawaiʻi at Mānoa in the Western Athletic Conference during the 1988 NCAA Division I-A football season. In their second season under head coach Bob Wagner, the Rainbow Warriors compiled a 9–3 record.

Schedule

References

Hawaii
Hawaii Rainbow Warriors football seasons
Hawaii Rainbow Warriors football